The Division of Henty was an Australian Electoral Division in Victoria. The division was created in 1913 and abolished in 1990. It was named for the Henty family of Portland, the first European settlers in Victoria. It was located in the south eastern suburbs of Melbourne, including at various times Brighton, Caulfield, Malvern and Oakleigh. For most of its history it was a safe seat for the Liberal Party and its predecessors.  A 1969 redistribution cut the seat back to the Oakleigh area, and from then on it was somewhat more marginal. In 1974 it elected Joan Child, the first female Labor member of the House of Representatives and the first female Speaker.

Members

Election results

Henty
Constituencies established in 1913
Constituencies disestablished in 1990
1913 establishments in Australia
1990 disestablishments in Australia